The Ynys Môn football team represents the island of Anglesey at the biennial Island Games. An island county within Wales, Ynys Môn is not a member of FIFA or UEFA and plays under the auspices of the Football Association of Wales, the governing body for football in Wales.

The island was chosen to host the 2019 Inter Games Football Tournament for both men and women after football was not included in the 2019 Island Games due to Gibraltar not having enough pitches.

Results
Largest win  at Island Games
 Anglesey 8–0  (29 June 1997)
Largest loss at Island Games
 6–0 Anglesey  (6 July 1989)

Achievements
Island Games:
1989 Silver Medal
1991 Silver Medal
1997 Silver Medal
1999 Gold Medal
2001 Silver Medal
Inter-Games gold medal:
2019 Gold Medal

Current squad
A 20-man squad was picked for the 2019 Inter Games Football Tournament in June 2019. The side was managed by Campbell Harrison.

Notable former players
The following have gone on to either represent Wales at senior international level, or have played in a professional football league.

Dion Donohue has represented Chesterfield,  Portsmouth and Swindon in the English Football League.

See also 
Anglesey
Island Games
Football at the Island Games

References

External links 
Island Games results on RSSSF
Anglesey matches on Roon ba

European national and official selection-teams not affiliated to FIFA
Sport in Anglesey